Libyan Arab Airlines Flight 114 (LN 114) was a regularly scheduled flight from Tripoli to Cairo via Benghazi that was shot down in 1973 by Israeli fighter jets after flying off course into prohibited airspace.

On 21 February 1973, the Boeing 727-200 that was serving this flight left Tripoli and flew to Benghazi. After taking off from Benghazi, it became lost because of a combination of bad weather and equipment failure over Northern Egypt. It entered Israeli controlled airspace over the Sinai Peninsula where it was intercepted by two Israeli F-4 Phantom IIs; it was shot down after several attempts from the Israeli fighter pilots to make the Libyan aircraft land. Of the 113 people on board, there were five survivors, including the co-pilot, as 108 civilians were killed in the incident.

Timeline

LN 114 was an international scheduled Tripoli–Benghazi–Cairo passenger service operated with a Boeing 727–224, registration 5A-DAH. There was a crew of nine on board the aircraft. Five crew members were French, including the pilot-in-command, 42-year-old Jacques Bourges. The crew were contracted to Air France and Libyan Arab Airlines. After a brief stop in Benghazi, the aircraft continued to Cairo with 113 people on board. Most of the passengers were Arabs but there were two Germans and an American on board.

Normally, the Benghazi–Cairo route was flown eastwards along the Libyan coast until reaching the city of Sidi Barrani in Egypt, where the airway turned inland to the VHF omnidirectional range (VOR) and non-directional beacon (NDB) area located west of Lake Qarun. At 13:45 the Cairo traffic control (CTC) saw the aircraft approaching from the west. Permission was granted to land on runway 23. CTC surprisingly saw the Boeing heading eastward towards the Suez Canal at 13:50. Evidence from both the recovered Boeing 727 voice recorders and the Israeli authorities' flight data recorder later showed that the Libyan aircraft was likely off course when it reported its position over Qarun, probably due to strong westerly upper-level winds associated with a low level sandstorm. The crew was forced to rely on instrument navigation because of this sandstorm. Both instrument and navigational error caused the aircraft to go off course, entering Israeli-controlled airspace over the Sinai Peninsula. By this time the aircraft had been lost by the Egyptian air traffic control. The crew believed they were close to the destination airport and started a descent.

Two Israeli Air Force Phantoms were sent to intercept the then-unidentified aircraft. Following the re-establishment of communications with CTC the pilot of the Libyan aircraft looked through the cabin's port window and saw the fighters, but he mistook them for Egyptian MIGs. At this point the Boeing's crew realised they were having problems with their instruments. The 727 adopting a westward course was interpreted by the Israeli pilots as an attempt to flee. The Israeli fighter pilots attempted to make visual contact with the airliner's crew and tried to communicate to them several times by signaling with their hands. With a gesture, the 727's pilot responded with a refusal, showing their intentions to continue instead. The fighters replied by dipping their wings but this was once again ignored by the Libyan airliner crew. It was at this time that the Israeli fighters attacked.

The Israeli Phantom pilots fired bursts from their  M61 cannons, severely damaging the airliner's control surfaces, hydraulic systems, and wing structure. LN 114 attempted an emergency landing but the aircraft hit the top of a sand dune; it bounced hard and a wing section was torn off before the airframe slid down a slope. Thirteen people were still alive in the burning wreckage when Israeli soldiers arrived at the crash site; seven of them still lived two days later. Of the 113 people aboard, 108 died, including the former foreign minister, Salah Busir.

Aftermath
The co-pilot, who survived, later said that the flight crew knew the Israeli jets wanted them to land but relations between Israel and Libya made them decide against following instructions. The Libyan government, however, said the attack occurred without warning. The Israeli Air Force perceived LN 114 as a security threat. The Israelis feared that the plane could have been undertaking an aerial spy mission over the Israeli air base at Bir Gifgafa, or that it was on a suicide mission, aiming to plunge into an Israeli city or the Negev Nuclear Research Center.

The Israeli government said LN 114 was shot down with the authorisation of David Elazar, the Israeli chief of staff. Israel's argument was that the heightened security situation and the erratic behaviour of the jet's crew made the attack prudent. Many nations, including the Soviet Union, condemned the attack. The United Nations did not take action against Israel. The 30 member-nations of the International Civil Aviation Organization voted to censure Israel for the attack. The United States did not accept the reasoning given by Israel, and condemned the incident. Israel's Defense Minister, Moshe Dayan, called it an "error of judgment", and Israel paid compensation to the victims' families.

Libyan leader Muammar Gaddafi was enraged by the incident and told Egyptian President Anwar Sadat that he intended to order an attack against Haifa. Sadat restrained him, hinting of war plans for what was to become the Yom Kippur War and warning that such an attack by Libya would likely result in an Israeli reprisal against Libyan airfields that would only damage the ability of Arab nations to launch a combined strike. When the bodies of the victims arrived in Libya, riots erupted in Tripoli and Benghazi. Public outrage was also directed at Egypt over the failure of the Egyptian Air Force to protect the airliner, and Salah Busir's son printed leaflets blaming his father's death on Egyptian cowardice. Two days after the incident, rioters attacked the Egyptian consulate in Benghazi.

Although Sadat had managed to convince Gaddafi to refrain from direct military retaliation, Gaddafi nonetheless attempted to retaliate by other means. The month after the incident, he offered Black September $10 million to blow up an El Al plane with passengers on board. On 4 April 1973, two Black September members were arrested in Rome carrying guns and hand grenades intended to be used in an attack on an El Al plane there. After this failure, Gaddafi decided to attack the Queen Elizabeth 2, which was then embarking on a special cruise from Southampton to Ashdod to commemorate the upcoming 25th anniversary of the Israeli Declaration of Independence with many Jews and other supporters of Israel aboard, among them the wife of Shimon Peres. On 17 April, Gaddafi issued an order to the commander of an Egyptian submarine that had been stationed in Libya under an Egyptian-Libyan joint defense agreement to sink the liner, claiming that under the defense agreement, the submarine and its crew were part of the Libyan armed forces and thus under his jurisdiction. The Egyptian government learned of the plan before it could be carried out. There are conflicting accounts as to how the information reached the Egyptian government, with one account stating that the submarine sent a coded message about its mission to the Egyptian naval base at Alexandria while another states that British planes detected the submarine's movements as it headed towards Malta and contacted the Egyptians. When Sadat was informed, he countermanded the order.

The Israeli Cabinet discussed the incident three times in secret meetings. The minutes, declassified in 2023, show that the main decisions were to deny all responsibility and to refuse to hold an official inquiry. A proposal to establish a standing order against shooting down civilian aircraft was rejected.

See also
 List of airliner shootdown incidents

References

External links

 List of 727 incidents.

1973 in Egypt
1973 in international relations
1973 in Israel
1973 in Libya
20th-century aircraft shootdown incidents
20th century in the Sinai Peninsula
Accidents and incidents involving the Boeing 727
Aerial operations and battles involving Israel
Airliner shootdown incidents
Aviation accidents and incidents in 1973
Aviation accidents and incidents in Egypt
Aviation accidents and incidents in Israel
Egypt–Israel relations
Egypt–Libya relations
Israel–Libya relations
February 1973 events in Asia
114